Hip Hop Lives is the collaborative studio album by American rapper KRS-One and record producer Marley Marl. It was released on May 22, 2007 via Koch Records. Recording sessions took place at House Of Hits in New York and at Westlake Recording Studios in Los Angeles. Production was handled by Marley Marl himself, except for one track produced with 88 Fingers. It features guest appearances from Blaq Poet, Busy Bee Starski and Magic Juan. The album's title is a response to Nas's 2006 album Hip Hop Is Dead.

The album peaked at No. 140 on the Billboard 200, No. 23 on the Top R&B/Hip-Hop Albums, No. 8 on the Top Rap Albums and No. 15 on the Independent Albums in the United States.

A music video was released for promotional single "Hip Hop Lives (I Come Back)".

Conception
"It all happened with one phone call", Marley Marl told AllHipHop during a March 2006 interview, "They called me and he jumped on the phone and told me it would be spectacular for hip hop… My reason for doing this is to show these kids that hip hop beefs are not that serious". The album marks the end of The Bridge Wars.

Track listing

Personnel

Lawrence "KRS-One" Parker – lyrics & vocals
John "Magic Juan" Wilson – lyrics & vocals (track 5)
Wilbur "Blaq Poet" Bass – lyrics & vocals (track 11)
David "Busy Bee" Parker – vocals (track 14)
Frederick "Red Alert" Crute – additional vocals (track 8)
Chris "DJ Premier" Martin – scratches (track 11)
Marlon "Marley Marl" Williams – producer, recording, mixing, A&R, co-executive producer
88-Fingers – producer (track 12)
Ivan Chevere – recording, mixing
Harold English – additional recording and mixing
Kevin "K-Def" Hansford – re-mixing (track 10)
Drew Lavyne – mastering
Simone G. Parker – executive producer, A&R, management
Rick Martin – co-executive producer, A&R, management
Leonardo Harris – art direction, design
Laura Grier – photography
Alyson Abbagnaro – A&R
Marleny Dominguez – A&R, management
Paul Grosso – creative director
Christian Mariano – product manager

Charts

References

External links

2007 albums
KRS-One albums
E1 Music albums
Marley Marl albums
Collaborative albums
Albums produced by Marley Marl
MNRK Music Group albums